Muscular Dystrophy Canada (MDC) is a non-profit organization that strives to find a cure for neuromuscular disorders. Founded in 1954 as Muscular Dystrophy Association of Canada, volunteers and staff nationwide have helped to provide support and resources to those affected. Since the founding year, over $64 million has been put towards research via collaborations, fundraising events, and donations.

Muscular Dystrophy Canada provides various programs within five areas of service: Education, Information, Advocacy, Support and Equipment.

In 2000, Muscular Dystrophy Canada joined with the ALS Society of Canada and the Canadian Institutes of Health Research in the Neuromuscular Research Partnership (NRP).

In 2011, there were over 38 chapters and two affiliates across Canada.

History 
Muscular Dystrophy Canada was founded in 1954 as the Muscular Dystrophy Association of Canada by Dr. David Green and Arthur Minden along with a number of parents whose children were affected by the disorder. The first President was Arthur Minden. Today Arthur Minden's humanitarian work is remembered by the Arthur Minden Pre-Doctoral Award, set up through Muscular Dystrophy Canada.  Fire fighters are Muscular Dystrophy Canada's strongest partners and have been involved with the organization since its inception.  Fire departments have continued to be Muscular Dystrophy Canada's strongest source of fund-raising support.

Fundraising 
Muscular Dystrophy Canada hosts many events and initiatives to raise funds.  The funds raised help provide research and much needed services for people with neuromuscular disorders. Muscular Dystrophy Canada events also raise awareness about these disorders and get entire communities involved.  Some of these fundraising efforts are:

 Walk for Muscular Dystrophy: this is Muscular Dystrophy Canada's signature event and over 55 events are held across Canada annually
 Fire Fighter Events: Fire Fighters give their time to organize Rooftop Campouts, boot drives, ladder sits, pancake breakfasts, raffles and much more.
 Wheelchair Dare: Participants spend the whole day in a wheelchair and experience what it's like to have limited mobility to raise funds and awareness
 Buck 4 Luck: Participating retail locations sell lucky shamrocks for one dollar 
 Hop for Muscular Dystrophy: this event raises funds, while educating preschool and elementary school children about neuromuscular disorders in a fun atmosphere of hopping and dancing.  It’s also an opportunity to promote compassionate, inclusive school communities, where people of all physical abilities are accepted for who they are.

References

External links 
 Muscular Dystrophy Canada

Muscular dystrophy organizations
Medical and health organizations based in British Columbia